Call the Midwife, later called Call the Midwife: A True Story of the East End in the 1950s, is a memoir by Jennifer Worth, and the first in a trilogy of books describing her work as a district nurse and midwife in the East End of London during the 1950s.  Worth wrote the book after retiring from a subsequent career as a musician, and it was originally published in July 2002. Reissued in 2007, it became a bestseller, as did the sequel Shadows of the Workhouse (2005, reissued 2008) and the final volume Farewell to the East End (2009). By the time of Jennifer Worth’s death in June 2011, her books had already sold almost a million copies. In 2012, the popular BBC adaptation of the trilogy boosted sales further, and all four of the  author's books about the East End (the "Midwife trilogy" and In the Midst of Life (2010) went back into the charts.

Background 
Worth wrote the book in response to an article by Terri Coates in the Royal College of Midwives Journal, which argued that midwives had been under-represented in literature and called on "a midwife somewhere to do for midwifery what James Herriot did for vets".  Worth wrote the first volume of her memoirs by hand and sent them to Coates to read, and Coates later served as advisor on the books and the TV adaptation.

Setting 
The book is set in Poplar, in the East End of London, where "Jenny Lee" (Worth’s maiden name) works as a midwife and district nurse, attached to a convent, Nonnatus House (a pseudonym for the Community of St. John the Divine, where Worth actually worked). The story is split between chapters describing individual mothers and their often-traumatic deliveries, and more light-hearted incidents back at the convent.  As well as the name of the convent, names of the characters are generally pseudonymous, with the exception of Cynthia, who remained a close friend of Jennifer Worth's in later life.

Characters 
 Jenny Lee, the author
 Jane, the extremely shy medical orderly
 Chummy Browne (née Camilla Fortescue-Cholmeley-Browne), a very tall, upper-class young nurse
 Cynthia Miller, a kind and thoughtful young nurse
 Trixie Franklin, a fun-loving young nurse
 Sister Julienne, the mother superior of the order of nuns
 Sister Evangelina, a rough-and-ready nun
 Sister Monica Joan, an elderly and eccentric nun struggling with the loss of an acute mind
 Sister Bernadette, a strict and dedicated midwife
 Novice Ruth, a young nurse and soon-to-be nun

Influence 
The success of Call the Midwife led publishers to release many similar real-life stories about nurses, midwives, and life in the East End of London in the 1950s, most notably Edith Cotterill’s Nurse on Call (Ebury, 2010), and Dot May Dunn’s midwife memoir Twelve Babies on a Bike (Orion, 2010). They both went into the Sunday Times bestseller lists.  Some writers acknowledged the inspiration they took from Worth’s writing – Duncan Barrett and Nuala Calvi, authors of The Sugar Girls, wrote that their "aim was to capture a lost way of life, just as Jennifer Worth had done", describing the midwife books as their "touchstone".

Critical reaction

Notes

Footnotes

External links 
Orion books website
BBC page for the TV adaptation
The Sugar Girls website

2002 non-fiction books
British memoirs
Works about midwifery
Non-fiction books adapted into television shows
Call the Midwife (franchise)